Martin McKenna  (born 27 July 1994) from Newcastle upon Tyne, is a British reality television personality known for his roles in two notable television shows, Geordie Shore and Ex on the Beach.

Career
In September 2010, Mckenna joined the British Army at Army Foundation College - Harrogate, aspiring to be in the Royal Regiment of Fusiliers. In March 2011, Mckenna applied for a Discharge as of Right (DAOR) and ended his career in the British Army. 
In August 2015, he was brought into the third series of Ex on the Beach as the ex of Jemma Lucy. He was joined by his ex-girlfriend, Sarah Goodhart, before leaving the show due to dehydration.

In October 2015, soon after his role in Ex on The Beach, he joined the twelfth series of Geordie Shore and he left the show in fifteenth series. On the show, he had an on and off relationship with Ex Chloe Ferry. In 2022, he appeared in the tenth series of Celebs Go Dating.

Filmography

List of MMA fights 
0 winners – 1 loss – 0 draws

References

Living people
Participants in British reality television series
Geordie Shore
People from Newcastle upon Tyne
1994 births